Alexander Cesare Gemignani (born July 3, 1979) is a Broadway actor, tenor, musician, and conductor.

Gemignani was raised in Tenafly, New Jersey and graduated from Tenafly High School in 1997. He is a graduate of the University of Michigan's Musical Theater Department.

He is the son of Broadway musical director Paul Gemignani and soprano Carolann Page. He is the artistic director of both the Eugene O'Neill Theater Center's National Music Theater Conference as well as the American Music Theatre Project at Northwestern University.

Gemignani was married in August 2008 to actor/director Erin Ortman.

Theatre credits

 John Hinckley in the Roundabout Theatre's Assassins
 Beadle Bamford in the John Doyle's 2005 Broadway revival of Sweeney Todd: The Demon Barber of Fleet Street (Drama Desk Award nomination for Outstanding Featured Actor in a Musical) 
 Jean Valjean in the 2006 Broadway revival of Les Misérables
 South Pacific, staged concert with Reba McEntire and Brian Stokes Mitchell at Carnegie Hall in June, 2005
 Passion, with Patti LuPone, Michael Cerveris, and Audra McDonald at The Rose Theater in March 2005 
 Sweeney Todd: The Demon Barber of Fleet Street in John Doyle's 2007 national tour of the Broadway production opposite Judy Kaye
 Boatman/Dennis in the 2008 Broadway revival of Sunday in the Park with George
 Addison Mizner in the Sondheim-Weidman 2008 musical Road Show at the Off-Broadway Public Theater
 Moishe Rosenwald in the new musical The People in the Picture at Studio 54 in 2011.
 Nick Merritt in the play Headstrong at Ensemble Studio Theatre in 2012 
 Billy Flynn in the Broadway revival of Chicago in 2013.
 Violet's Father in the Broadway Revival of Violet.
 King George III in the Chicago production of Hamilton
 Enoch Snow in the Broadway production of Carousel (Tony and Grammy award nominations) in 2018.
 Alfred P. Doolittle in the Broadway production of My Fair Lady in 2019.

Sondheim tributes
Gemignani participated in a memorable performance of "Opening Doors" from Merrily We Roll Along at Symphony Space's Wall to Wall Sondheim event celebrating Sondheim's 75th birthday in March 2005. He also performed in three gala concerts honoring Sondheim's 80th birthday in 2010: with the New York Philharmonic at Avery Fisher Hall, singing "Something's Coming" from West Side Story in March; then at New York City Center in April; and with The New York Pops at Carnegie Hall in November.  And he performed "Buddy's Blues" from Follies in the online 90th birthday celebration, "Take Me To The World" on April 26, 2020. He made his conducting debut with the New York Philharmonic in Live from Lincoln Center's "New Year’s Eve: Celebrating Sondheim" on December 31, 2019.

Non-Performance Work
Recently, Gemignani has begun to work as a music director, following in his father's footsteps. He served as the conductor, music director, and music supervisor for the 2020 revival of West Side Story, and has developed pieces for the Public Theatre and the Roundabout Theatre Company. He served as music director and orchestrator for the Fiasco Theatre production of Merrily We Roll Along. He is also an educator and is an associate professor at Northwestern University.

References

External links

Alexander Gemignani on Broadway Buzz Star File

1979 births
Living people
People from Tenafly, New Jersey
Tenafly High School alumni
American male musical theatre actors
University of Michigan School of Music, Theatre & Dance alumni
Theatre World Award winners